Lingaya's Vidyapeeth is a private deemed-to-be university located in Faridabad, Haryana, India. It was established in 1990, as Lingaya's Institute of Management and Technology.

History
It was established in 1998, as Lingaya's Institute of Management And Technology and initially, it was affiliated to Maharishi Dayanand University. In 2009, the institute became a deemed-to-be university under Section 3 of UGC Act 1956, and was renamed Lingaya's University (now Lingaya's Vidyapeeth).

See also
 State University of Performing And Visual Arts
 State Institute of Film and Television

References

Education in Faridabad
Universities in Haryana
Law schools in Haryana